Hanna Busz-Przelaskowska (born 23 November 1940) is a former Polish volleyball player, a member of Poland women's national volleyball team in 1962–1968, a bronze medalist of the Olympic Games Tokyo 1964, seven-time Polish Champion (1958, 1960, 1962, 1963, 1964, 1965, 1966).

1940 births
Living people
Polish women's volleyball players
Olympic volleyball players of Poland
Volleyball players at the 1964 Summer Olympics
Olympic bronze medalists for Poland
Olympic medalists in volleyball
Medalists at the 1964 Summer Olympics
Sportspeople from Poznań